Simone Kessell (born 19 August 1975) is a New Zealand television actress known for her role as Lt. Alicia Washington in the short lived Fox science fiction television series Terra Nova. In 2016, Kessell starred opposite Ray Winstone on the short-lived ABC prime-time television fantasy soap opera Of Kings and Prophets.

Personal life
Kessell is married to Australian director Gregor Jordan. They have two sons, Jack and Beau.

Filmography

Film

Television

References

External links
 
 Auckland Actors Website

1975 births
Living people
New Zealand film actresses
New Zealand television actresses
20th-century New Zealand actresses
21st-century New Zealand actresses